Azadliq Square, in Baku is the biggest city-centre square in Azerbaijan. It lies next to Baku Boulevard.

History

The square, formerly named Lenin Square after Vladimir Lenin, was created in the 1960–70s, after construction of the Government House of Baku was finished in 1952. A monument to Lenin was erected in 1955. It was also formerly known as Stalin Square. Along with the square, Baku authorities constructed several buildings including the "Azerbaijan" and "Absheron" hotels encircling the square, which were later demolished and replaced with the Hilton Baku and the JW Marriott Absheron Baku Hotel. The Lenin monument sculpted by D. M. Garyaghdi was removed in the early 1990s. The square was renamed Azadliq Square (Freedom Square) in 1991 after the collapse of the Soviet Union. In 2006, a government-sponsored project oversaw renovation works at Government House and its vicinity including Azadliq Square. Works lasted until 2010.

Buildings and structures
 Government House
 Baku Boulevard, across the Neftchiler Avenue
 JW Marriott Absheron Baku Hotel
 Hilton Baku

Gallery

Events

Parades

During the Cold War, Lenin Square was used as a parade ground for the annual International Workers' Day demonstration on May 1, as well as the Victory Day and October Revolution Day military parades on May 9 and November 7 respectively. Azadliq Square is the main venue for the bi-annual Day of the Armed Forces military parade which takes place on June 26. In 2018, the square was used as the main venue for the centennial celebrations of the Battle of Baku, which was attended by Presidents Ilham Aliyev and Recep Tayyip Erdogan. On 10 December 2020, a victory parade took place on Azadliq Square, honouring the Azerbaijani victory during the 2020 Nagorno-Karabakh war, during which Armenian war trophies and Azerbaijani military vehicles, were displayed.

Demonstrations
Starting on 17 November 1988, large-scale demonstrations began in Baku's Lenin Square to protest against the alleged destruction of a forest near Shusha by Armenians. As the demonstrations continued, they became increasingly anti-Armenian, with chants of "death to the Armenians" and demands that those convicted of the murder of Armenians during the Sumgait pogrom be released. The demonstrations also developed into an anti-central government, anti-Soviet protest. On 23 November, a curfew was imposed in Baku and Soviet troops tried unsuccessfully to disperse the crowds. The events later led to the proclamation, in 1992, of National Revival Day of 17 November. Following the Black January crackdown by Soviet troops in Baku on 20 January 1990, Azadliq Square became the gathering and mourning place for approximately 2 million people who gathered to take the dead to a burial site in Martyrs' Lane in upper Baku.

Protests during the 2003 Azerbaijani protests took place on the square.

Other
In 1989 one of Azerbaijan's greatest vocalists, Yaqub Zourofchi, held a revolutionary concert as Azerbaijan was gaining their independence from USSR. The square was used for the Baku City Circuit.

See also
Black January
Azerbaijani independence movement
Mayoralty of Baku
Neftchiler Avenue

References

External links 

Squares in Baku
Architecture in Azerbaijan